Ernesto Fígoli (21 August 1888 – 26 July 1951), nicknamed "Matucho", was a Uruguayan football manager. He managed Uruguay to victory in the 1920 and 1926 South American Championships, and to the gold medal at the 1924 Olympics. Later, he contributed to Uruguay's 1928 Olympics gold medal and 1930 and 1950 FIFA World Cup wins as masseur and kinesiologist. He was named world's greatest manager of the 1920s by Berlin-Britz.

References

1888 births
1951 deaths
Uruguayan football managers
Uruguay national football team managers